Kevin van Dessel (born 9 April 1979 in Kapellen) is a Belgian former footballer who last played for EVV in the Dutch Topklasse. Prior to that he served Germinal Ekeren, NAC Breda, Genoa C.F.C., Roda JC, Sint-Truidense V.V., VVV-Venlo and APOP Kinyras Peyias FC.

Honours
Roda JC
KNVB Cup: 1999–2000

References

External links
Profile at Voetbal International

1979 births
Living people
Belgian footballers
Belgium youth international footballers
Belgium under-21 international footballers
Beerschot A.C. players
Roda JC Kerkrade players
NAC Breda players
Genoa C.F.C. players
Sint-Truidense V.V. players
APOP Kinyras FC players
VVV-Venlo players
Belgian Pro League players
Eredivisie players
Eerste Divisie players
Derde Divisie players
Cypriot First Division players
Belgian expatriate footballers
Expatriate footballers in the Netherlands
Belgian expatriate sportspeople in the Netherlands
Expatriate footballers in Cyprus
Expatriate footballers in Italy
People from Kapellen, Belgium
RKVV EVV players
Association football midfielders
Footballers from Antwerp Province